Nationality words link to articles with information on the nation's poetry or literature (for instance, Irish or French).

Works published

English
 Anonymous, publication year conjectural, 
 Anonymous, publication year conjectural, Guy of Warwick, related to the Anglo-Norman Gui de Warewic (c. 1232–1242)
 Anonymous, Sir Bevis of Hampton, translated c. 1300 from the Anglo-Norman Boeve de Haumtone c. 1200
 Anonymous, Sir Eglamour of Artois, written in the mid-14th century
 Geoffrey Chaucer, published anonymously, publication year conjectural, Mars and Venus, an amalgamation of the author's The Complaint of Mars and The Complaint of Venus
 John Lydgate, published anonymously, publication year conjectural, The Virtue of the Mass, also called the Interpretacio Misse

Other
 Stora rimkronikan ("The Great Rhymed Chronicle"), published about this year, Sweden
 Erasmus, De Laudibus Britanniae, a Latin ode in which the author calls John Skelton, appointed tutor to Prince Henry of England, "unum Britannicarum literarum lumen ac decus", and congratulates the prince for having so fine a teacher.
 Pierre Gringore, le Château d’Amours, France
 Singiraja, Maha Basavaraja Charitra, India

Births

Death years link to the corresponding "[year] in poetry" article:
 December 6 - Nicolaus Mameranus (died c. 1567), Luxembourgian soldier and Latin-language historian and poet
 Erasmus Alberus, birth year uncertain (died 1553), German humanist, reformer and poet
 Shlomo Halevi Alkabetz (died 1580), Greek kabbalist and poet
 Antonius Arena, also known as "Antoine Arènes" (died 1544), French jurist and poet
 Eustorg Beaulieu (died 1552), French
 John Bellenden (died about 1548), English
 Bonaventure des Périers, born about this year (suicide 1544), French author and poet
 George Cavendish, born this year according to one source but another states 1494 (died about 1561), English
 Hayâlî (خيالى) (died 1557), Ottoman Turkish
 Nikolaus Herman, birth year uncertain (died 1561), German hymnodist
 Marcello Palingenio Stellato, born this year or 1503 (died 1543), Italian, Latin-language poet
 Ludovico Pasquali (died 1551), Italian author and poet
 Christoff Wirsung, birth year uncertain (died 1571), German
 Wu Cheng'en born 1500 or 1505 (died c. 1580), Chinese novelist and poet of the Ming Dynasty

Deaths
Birth years link to the corresponding "[year] in poetry" article:
 June 23 - Lodovico Lazzarelli (born 1450), Italian, Latin-language poet, philosopher, courtier and magician
 Bhalam (born c. 1426), Indian, Gujarati-language poet
 Serafino Ciminelli, also known as "Serafino Aquilano" (born 1466), Italian poet, singer, author and actor
 Robert Henryson, last known to be active about this year (flourished from c. 1460), Scottish makar poet
 Michele Marullo (born  1453), Italian, Latin-language poet
 Per Raff Lille, died about this year (born c. 1450), Danish poet
 Giovanni Mattia Tabarino (born  c. 1420), Italian, Latin-language poet

See also

 Poetry
 Other events of the 15th century
 Other events of the 16th century
 15th century in poetry
 16th century in poetry
 Grands Rhétoriqueurs
 List of years in poetry
 16th century in literature
 French Renaissance literature
 Renaissance literature
 Spanish Renaissance literature

Notes

15th-century poetry
Poetry

bs:Književnost 16. vijeka
pl:XVI wiek - literatura